Moscheen und Madrasabauten in Iran 1785–1848: Architektur zwischen Rückgriff und Neuerung is a 2005 book by Markus Ritter in which the author examines late 18th to mid-19th century architecture of Iran in mosques and madrasas. The book won the Farabi International Award.

Reception
The book has been reviewed in the Abstracta Iranica and Iranian Studies.

See also
Qajar art

References

External links 
 Moscheen und Madrasabauten in Iran 1785–1848

English-language books
Architecture books
Qajar architecture
Brill Publishers books
2005 non-fiction books